Dąbrowa-Tworki  is a village in the administrative district of Gmina Szepietowo, within Wysokie Mazowieckie County, Podlaskie Voivodeship, in north-eastern Poland.

The village has an approximate population of 30.

References

Villages in Wysokie Mazowieckie County